Limu is a village in Rae Parish, Harju County, in northern Estonia. It has a population of 41 (as of 1 January 2010).

Population

References

Villages in Harju County